Babe (also known as Babe the Sheep-Pig in the working title) is a 1995 comedy-drama film directed by Chris Noonan, produced by George Miller and written by both. It is an adaptation of Dick King-Smith's 1983 novel The Sheep-Pig, which tells the story of a farm pig who wants to do the work of a sheepdog. The film is narrated by Roscoe Lee Browne and the main animal characters are played by both real animals and animatronic puppets.

Babe was filmed in Robertson, New South Wales in 1994 and released theatrically on 4 August 1995, going on to become a critical and commercial success, with several Academy Award nominations. A sequel, Babe: Pig in the City, was released on 25 November 1998 and failed to achieve the same success as the first film.

Plot

After being used in "guess the weight" contest at a county fair, orphaned piglet Babe is brought home to the farm of the contest winner, Arthur Hoggett. There he is taken in by Border Collie Fly, her irascible mate Rex and their puppies and befriends a duck named Ferdinand, who wakes people by crowing like a rooster every morning so he will be considered useful and be spared from being eaten. 

Dismayed when the Hoggetts buy an alarm clock, Ferdinand persuades Babe to help him destroy it. In doing so they wake Duchess, the Hoggetts' cat, and wreck the house in the ensuing chaos. Rex sternly instructs Babe to stay away from Ferdinand and the house. Seeing Fly saddened when her puppies are put up for sale, Babe lets her adopt him. With the Hoggett's relatives visiting for Christmas, Hoggett decides against choosing Babe for Christmas dinner, remarking a pretext to his wife Esme that Babe may bring a prize for ham at the next county fair. Ferdinand's friend Rosanna is served instead, prompting Ferdinand to escape the farm. Babe investigates the fields, where he witnesses two men stealing Hoggett's sheep and quickly alerts Fly and the farmer, preventing the thieves from taking the whole flock. 

Impressed after seeing Babe sort hens, separating the brown from the white ones, Hoggett takes him to try and herd the sheep. Encouraged by an elder ewe named Maa, the sheep cooperate, but Rex perceives Babe's actions as an insult to sheepdogs. After Fly stands up for Babe, Rex attacks and injures her and bites Hoggett's hand when he tries to intervene; Rex is subsequently chained to the dog house and sedated, leaving the sheep herding job to Babe. One morning, Babe scares off a trio of feral dogs attacking the sheep, but Maa is mortally injured, and dies as a result. Hoggett, thinking Babe killed Maa, prepares to shoot him but Fly finds out the truth from the sheep and distracts Hoggett for long enough until Esme informs him about the dogs' attacks on neighboring farms.
		
When Esme leaves on a trip, Hoggett signs Babe up for a local sheepherding competition. As it is raining the night before, Hoggett lets him and Fly into the house, where he is scratched by Duchess, who in turn is temporarily confined outside as punishment. When she is let back in later, she gets revenge on Babe by revealing that humans consume pigs. After learning from Fly that this is true, Babe runs away and Rex finds him the next morning in a cemetery. Hoggett brings a horrified and demoralized Babe home, where he refuses to eat. Hoggett feeds him from a baby bottle, sings "If I Had Words" and dances a jig for him, restoring Babe's faith in Hoggett's affection.
	
At the competition, Babe meets the sheep that he will be herding, but they ignore his attempts to speak to them. As Hoggett is criticized by the bemused judges and ridiculed by the public for using a pig instead of a dog, Rex runs back to the farm to ask the sheep what to do. After promising he will treat them better from now on, the sheep disclose to him a secret password. He returns in time to convey the password to Babe, and the sheep now follow his instructions flawlessly. Amid the crowd's acclamation, Babe is unanimously given the highest score. While he sits down next to the farmer, Hoggett praises him with the standard command to sheep dogs that their job is done, "That'll do, Pig. That'll do."

Cast

 Christine Cavanaugh as Babe
 Danny Mann as Ferdinand
 James Cromwell as Arthur Hoggett
 Miriam Margolyes as Fly
 Hugo Weaving as Rex
 Magda Szubanski as Esme Hoggett
 Miriam Flynn as Maa
 Russi Taylor as Duchess
 Roscoe Lee Browne as the Narrator
 Brittany Byrnes as the Hoggetts' granddaughter
 Wade Hayward as the Hoggetts' grandson
 Paul Goddard as the Hoggetts' son-in-law
 Zoe Burton as the Hoggetts' daughter
 Michael Edward-Stevens as The Horse
 Charles Bartlett as The Cow
 Evelyn Krape as an unnamed Ewe
 Paul Livingston as Rooster
 Mary Acres as Valda
 Janet Foye, Pamela Hawkins and Karen Gough as Country Women
 John Doyle and Mike Harris as TV Commentators
 John Erwin as Voice of TV Commentator
 Doris Grau as Voice of Country Woman
 Marshall Napier as Chairman of Judges

The puppies were voiced by Ross Bagley, Gemini Barnett, Rachel Davey, Debi Derryberry, Jazzmine Dillingham, Courtland Mead, and Kevin Woods.

The sheep were voiced by Jane Alden, Kimberly Bailey, Patrika Darbo, Michelle Davison, Julie Forsyth, Maeve Germaine, Rosanna Huffman, Carlyle King, Tina Lifford, Genni Nevinson, Linda Phillips, Paige Pollack, and Kerry Walker.

The other character voices were provided by Barbara Harris, Jacqueline Brennan, Doug Burch, Tony Hughes, Linda Janssen, Daamen Krall, Charlie MacLean, Justin Monjo, Antonia Murphy, Neil Ross and Scott Vernon.

Production
Babe is an adaptation of Dick King-Smith's 1983 novel The Sheep-Pig, also known as Babe: The Gallant Pig in the US, which tells the story of a pig raised as livestock who wants to do the work of a sheepdog. The main animal characters are played by a combination of real and animatronic pigs and Border Collies. The breed of pig used was a Large White, which grows rapidly. On account of this, 46 piglets of the required size were used during the course of the filming, as well as the animatronic model for special effects.

The film is divided into six chapters to preserve the storybook-like feel of the original novel (although none of the film's chapters are the same as the book's). The film's mice characters were subsequently added to read the chapter titles aloud after a test screening in which producer George Miller noted that younger audiences had trouble reading them, needing help from the adults.

After seven years of development, Babe was filmed in Robertson, New South Wales, Australia. The talking-animal visual effects were done by Rhythm & Hues Studios and Jim Henson's Creature Shop. The film was both a box office and critical success, grossing $254 million worldwide and earning seven Oscar nominations, including a win for Best Visual Effects.

According to actor James Cromwell, there was tension on the set between producer George Miller and director Chris Noonan. Noonan later complained, "I don't want to make a lifelong enemy of George Miller but I thought that he tried to take credit for Babe, tried to exclude me from any credit, and it made me very insecure... It was like your guru has told you that you are no good and that is really disconcerting."

Miller shot back, "Chris said something that is defamatory: that I took his name off the credits on internet sites, which is just absolutely untrue. You know, I'm sorry but I really have a lot more to do with my life than worry about that... when it comes to Babe, the vision was handed to Chris on a plate."

Interviewed about the movie in 2020, Cromwell admitted he nearly turned it down, as his character only had about 16 lines. He was persuaded by his friend Charles Keating to take it anyway. Keating told him: "it's a free ticket to Australia, and if the movie tanks, it's not your fault, it's the pig's fault." Cromwell said Noonan wanted him for the part, and won out over Miller, who had wanted to cast an Australian actor. Cromwell's fee was around $50,000. He asked for an increase when he realised the movie was making millions of dollars, but was turned down. Nevertheless, he said "I got a lot out of that film, and it turned my whole life around. I didn't have to audition anymore."

In 1998, a sequel directed by Miller, Babe: Pig in the City, was released. In 2006, a video game of the same name based on the film, was published by Mastertronic for the PlayStation 2.

Music
The musical score for Babe was composed by Nigel Westlake and performed by the Melbourne Symphony Orchestra. Classical orchestral music by 19th-century French composers is used throughout the film, but is disguised in a variety of ways and often integrated by Westlake into his score. The theme song "If I Had Words" (lyrics by Jonathan Hodge), sung by Hoggett near the film's conclusion, is an adaptation of the Maestoso final movement of the Organ Symphony by Camille Saint-Saëns, and was originally performed in 1977 by Scott Fitzgerald and Yvonne Keeley. This tune also recurs throughout the film's score.

There are also brief quotations within the score from Edvard Grieg's Lyric Pieces, Op.71 No. 1. Other music featured is by Léo Delibes, Richard Rodgers, Gabriel Fauré, and Georges Bizet.

Reception
The film was a box office success, grossing $36.7 million at the box office in Australia and over $254 million worldwide. It also received critical acclaim and was ultimately nominated for seven Academy Awards, including Best Picture, Best Director, Best Supporting Actor for James Cromwell, Best Screenplay Based on Material Previously Produced or Published, Best Art Direction and Best Film Editing, winning Best Visual Effects. At the APRA Music Awards of 1996 it won Best Film Score for Westlake's work. In 2006, the American Film Institute named Babe #80 on its list of America's Most Inspiring Movies. On review aggregator website Rotten Tomatoes, the film has an approval rating of 97% based on 70 reviews, with a rating average of 8.26/10. The website's critical consensus reads: "The rare family-friendly feature with a heart as big as its special effects budget, Babe offers timeless entertainment for viewers of all ages." Metacritic gave the film a score of 83 based on 16 reviews, indicating "universal acclaim".

Because of its subject being a piglet, Babe was initially banned from Malaysia in order to avoid upsetting or annoying Muslims (who view pigs as haram). The ruling was overturned almost a year later and the film was released direct-to-video.

When Babe was released in the US, it is reported that "activists around the country staked out movie theatres with flyers documenting the real-life abuses of pigs". The film had a marked effect on the growth of vegetarianism, particularly among the young. It also promoted a more sympathetic view of the intellectual, emotional and social capacities of animals. James Cromwell became an ethical vegan as a result of starring as Farmer Hoggett, saying, "I decided that to be able to talk about this [movie] with conviction, I needed to become a vegetarian." In 1996 he went on to organize a vegetarian dinner for the Los Angeles homeless at a "Compassionate Christmas" event in order to reverse the barnyard view that "Christmas is carnage".

Accolades

References

External links

 
 
 
 
Babe at Oz Movies

1995 films
British children's films
1990s English-language films
American children's comedy films
American children's drama films
American coming-of-age films
APRA Award winners
Australian children's films
Australian comedy-drama films
Australian coming-of-age films
Best Musical or Comedy Picture Golden Globe winners
Children's comedy-drama films
Films scored by Nigel Westlake
Films about animals
Films about animal rights
Films about ducks
Films about farmers
Films about pigs
Films about dogs
Films about sheep
Films based on children's books
Films directed by Chris Noonan
Films produced by George Miller
Films produced by Bill Miller
Films produced by Doug Mitchell
Films set on farms
Films set in England
Films shot in Australia
Films that won the Best Visual Effects Academy Award
Kennedy Miller Mitchell films
Universal Pictures films
1990s children's films
Films with screenplays by George Miller
National Society of Film Critics Award for Best Film winners
1995 directorial debut films
1990s American films
1990s British films